Gintaras Didžiokas (born 10 August 1966, Vilnius) is a Lithuanian politician and Member of the European Parliament for the Peasants and New Democratic Party Union; part of the Union for a Europe of Nations.

External links 
  Europarliament member's info page (Gintaras Didžiokas)
 Official site

1966 births
Living people
Politicians from Vilnius
Lithuanian Farmers and Greens Union MEPs
MEPs for Lithuania 2004–2009
Members of the Seimas